Zulu is an unincorporated town in Jefferson Township, Allen County, in the U.S. state of Indiana.

History
The name Zulu was selected at random from an encyclopedia. A post office was established at Zulu in 1880, and remained in operation until 1904.

References

Unincorporated communities in Allen County, Indiana
Unincorporated communities in Indiana
Fort Wayne, IN Metropolitan Statistical Area